David McInerney (born 7 December 1992) is an Irish hurler who plays as a full-back for the Clare senior team.  At club level McInerney plays with Tulla. He helped Tulla win the Senior B title in 2010 with victory over Inagh-Kilnamona.
McInerney made his Senior Championship debut on 2 June 2013 against Waterford, starting at full-back in a 2-20 to 1-15 victory. McInerney scored his first point for the Clare seniors in the victory over Laois in the 2013 All Ireland qualifiers. 

During McInerney's early Clare career he has amassed 1 Munster minor medal, 2 Munster u21 medals, 2 All Ireland u21 medals and 1 All Ireland Senior Championship medal to date. In three consecutive appearances for Clare at both u21 and senior level David managed a hat trick of man of the match performances. These awards were given after Clare's respective victories over Tipperary in the Munster u21 final, against Limerick in the All Ireland senior semi final and Galway in the All Ireland u21 semi final.

McInerney is the son of the former Clare hurler Jim McInerney who was part of the winning Clare panel in 1995.

In October 2013, McInerney was named the Bord Gais U-21 hurling Player of the Year for 2013.

Honours
 All-Ireland Senior Hurling Championship (1): 2013
 Munster Under-21 Hurling Championship (2) 2012, 2013
 All-Ireland Under-21 Hurling Championship (2) 2012, 2013
 Munster Minor Hurling Championship (1) : 2011
 Fitzgibbon Cup (1): 2015 (c)

Individual
 GAA-GPA All-Star Award (1): 2013
 Bord Gáis Energy U-21 Player of the Year (1) : 2013
 Bord Gáis Energy U-21 All-Star (1) : 2013

References

1992 births
Living people
Clare inter-county hurlers
Irish schoolteachers
Tulla (Clare) hurlers